The 1997 'Friendship Cup' , also known as the 1997 Sahara 'Friendship Cup'  for sponsorship reasons was a One Day International cricket series which took place between 13 and 21 September 1997.  The tournament was held in Canada, which was seen as perfect neutral territory for India and Pakistan to play each other.  The tournament was won by India 4–1.

Teams

 - warm-up match only

Squads

Warm-up match

ODI series

1st ODI

2nd ODI

3rd ODI

Replay

4th ODI

5th ODI

Statistics

Spectator incident
During the 2nd ODI, spectator Shiv Kumar Thind, an Indian living in Toronto, used a megaphone to shout abuse at Pakistan batsman Inzamam-ul-Haq.  Thind likened ul-Haq's physical size to that of several kinds of potato and The Buddha.  ul-Haq took offense to this and proceeded to enter the crowd and challenge Thind.  When Thind threw his megaphone at him, ul-Haq borrowed a cricket bat from a teammate and attempted to attack Thind with it.  The event subsequently caused a 37-minute delay in the game and later resulted in both men filing charges of assault against one another.  Thind and ul-Haq later withdrew the charges, although the Pakistan Cricket Board banned ul-Haq for two matches.

References

External links
1997 'Friendship Cup'  at CricketArchive

1997 in Canadian sports
1997 in cricket
International cricket competitions from 1994–95 to 1997